Barrow County is a county located in the north central portion of the U.S. state of Georgia. As of the 2020 Census, the population was 83,505.  The county seat is Winder.

Barrow County is included in the Atlanta-Sandy Springs-Roswell, GA Metropolitan Statistical Area.

History
Barrow County was created from portions of Gwinnett, Jackson, and Walton counties when Georgia voters approved a constitutional amendment on November 3, 1914, making Barrow County the 149th Georgia county out of 159. Barrow County was named after David Crenshaw Barrow, Jr., a University of Georgia mathematics and engineering professor who was later Chancellor serving in that position from 1906 to 1925. Barrow died on January 11, 1929, in Athens and is buried in Oconee Hill Cemetery in Athens.

Geography
The entirety of Barrow County is located in the Upper Oconee River sub-basin of the Altamaha River basin.

Adjacent counties
 Hall County – north
 Clarke County – east
 Jackson County – east
 Oconee County – southeast
 Walton County – south
 Gwinnett County – west

Transportation

Major highways

  Interstate 85
  U.S. Route 29
 U.S. Route 29 Business
  State Route 8
  State Route 11
  State Route 53
  State Route 81
  State Route 82
  State Route 124
  State Route 211
  State Route 316
  State Route 324
  State Route 330
  State Route 403 (unsigned designation for I-85)

Demographics

2000 census
As of the census of 2000, there were 46,144 people, 16,354 households, and 12,543 families living in the county. There were 17,304 housing units at an average density of 107 per square mile (41/km2). The racial makeup of the county was 84.84% White, 10.72% Black or African American, 0.30% Native American, 2.20% Asian, 0.04% Pacific Islander, 1.50% from other races, and 1.40% from two or more races.  3.16% of the population were Hispanic or Latino of any race. Barrow County is considered a part of the Atlanta, GA combined statistical area despite its comparatively small population.

There were 16,354 households, out of which 39.90% had children under the age of 18 living with them, 60.30% were married couples living together, 11.60% had a female householder with no husband present, and 23.30% were non-families. 18.60% of all households were made up of individuals, and 6.70% had someone living alone who was 65 years of age or older.  The average household size was 2.79 and the average family size was 3.17.

In the county, the population was spread out, with 28.40% under the age of 18, 8.50% from 18 to 24, 34.50% from 25 to 44, 19.50% from 45 to 64, and 9.10% who were 65 years of age or older.  The median age was 32 years. For every 100 females, there were 98.90 males.  For every 100 females age 18 and over, there were 95.70 males.

The median income for a household in the county was $47,019, and the median income for a family was $50,722. Males had a median income of $34,510 versus $23,369 for females. The per capita income for the county was $18,350.  About 6.20% of families and 8.30% of the population were below the poverty line, including 9.10% of those under age 18 and 14.40% of those age 65 or over.

2010 census
As of the 2010 United States Census, there were 69,367 people, 23,971 households, and 18,214 families living in the county. The racial makeup of the county was 78.8% white, 11.4% black or African American, 3.4% Asian, 0.3% American Indian, 0.1% Pacific islander, 3.7% from other races, and 2.3% from two or more races. Those of Hispanic or Latino origin made up 8.7% of the population. In terms of ancestry, 20.6% were American, 10.7% were Irish, 9.1% were German, and 8.5% were English.

Of the 23,971 households, 42.6% had children under the age of 18 living with them, 57.0% were married couples living together, 13.4% had a female householder with no husband present, 24.0% were non-families, and 18.8% of all households were made up of individuals. The average household size was 2.88 and the average family size was 3.28. The median age was 33.6 years.

The median income for a household in the county was $48,958 and the median income for a family was $55,415. Males had a median income of $42,869 versus $33,175 for females. The per capita income for the county was $20,882. About 9.4% of families and 12.6% of the population were below the poverty line, including 16.0% of those under age 18 and 14.2% of those age 65 or over.

2020 census

As of the 2020 United States census, there were 83,505 people, 27,765 households, and 20,948 families residing in the county.

Education

Winder-Barrow Cluster:
 Winder-Barrow High School
 Richard B. Russell Middle School
 Winder-Barrow Middle School (1956-2013)
 Bear Creek Middle School (WBMS replacement)
 Holsenbeck Elementary School
 Bramlett Elementary School
 Statham Elementary School
 County Line Elementary

Apalachee Cluster:
 Apalachee High School
 Westside Middle School
 Haymon-Morris Middle School
 Auburn Elementary School
 Kennedy Elementary School
 Bethlehem Elementary School
 Yargo Elementary School
 Barrow Arts & Sciences Academy

Communities

Cities
 Auburn
 Statham
 Winder

Towns
 Bethlehem
 Braselton
 Carl

Census-designated place
 Russell

Other unincorporated communities
 Barrow Heights
 Whistelville

Politics

See also

 National Register of Historic Places listings in Barrow County, Georgia
List of counties in Georgia

References

External links
 Georgia Encyclopedia -  Barrow County entry
 Barrow County Georgia website
 Barrow County Chamber of Commerce
 Barrow County News
 Barrow County historical marker
 Bethabra Baptist Church historical marker

 
Counties in the Atlanta metropolitan area
1914 establishments in Georgia (U.S. state)
Populated places established in 1914
Georgia (U.S. state) counties
Counties of Appalachia